Plagiorhynchus is a genus of parasitic worms belonging to the family Plagiorhynchidae.

The genus has almost cosmopolitan distribution.

Species:

Plagiorhynchus allisonae 
Plagiorhynchus angrensis 
Plagiorhynchus asturi

References

Plagiorhynchidae
Acanthocephala genera